Judith Gap is a city in Wheatland County, Montana, United States. The population was 110 at the 2020 census.

History 
The railway station here was initially named "Ubet", after A. R. Barrows' nearby stage stop settlement Ubet, Montana. Judith Gap, like the river and mountains, derives its name from Capt. William Clark’s fiancée, Julia (Judith) Hancock.

Judith Gap’s economic prospects soared in 2005 with the construction of a major wind farm.

Geography
Judith Gap is located at  (46.678874, -109.753151).

The city is situated in the historic Judith Gap, which is a small gap between the two towering mountain ranges (Big Snowy Mountains and Little Belt Mountains) that separate Central Montana from Southern Montana. This gap has been used by settlers and Native Americans for centuries, including Chief Joseph and the Nez Perce during their famous 1877 flight to Canada.

Demographics

2010 census
As of the census of 2010, there were 126 people, 64 households, and 34 families residing in the city. The racial makeup of the city was 96.0% White, 0.8% African American, 2.4% Asian, and 0.8% from two or more races.

There were 64 households, of which 12.5% had children under the age of 18 living with them, 46.9% were married couples living together, 4.7% had a female householder with no husband present, 1.6% had a male householder with no wife present, and 46.9% were non-families. 42.2% of all households were made up of individuals, and 9.4% had someone living alone who was 65 years of age or older. The average household size was 1.97 and the average family size was 2.65.

The median age in the city was 58 years. 10.3% of residents were under the age of 18; 9.6% were between the ages of 18 and 24; 15.1% were from 25 to 44; 38.9% were from 45 to 64; and 26.2% were 65 years of age or older. The gender makeup of the city was 52.4% male and 47.6% female.

2000 census
As of the census of 2000, there were 164 people, 69 households, and 48 families residing in the city. The population density was 440.9 people per square mile (171.1/km2). There were 94 housing units at an average density of 252.7 per square mile (98.1/km2). The racial makeup of the city was 91.46% White, 1.22% African American, 1.22% Native American, 0.61% Asian, and 5.49% from two or more races.

There were 69 households, out of which 34.8% had children under the age of 18 living with them, 49.3% were married couples living together, 7.2% had a female householder with no husband present, and 30.4% were non-families. 30.4% of all households were made up of individuals, and 11.6% had someone living alone who was 65 years of age or older. The average household size was 2.38 and the average family size was 2.83.

In the city, the population was spread out, with 30.5% under the age of 18, 5.5% from 18 to 24, 21.3% from 25 to 44, 31.7% from 45 to 64, and 11.0% who were 65 years of age or older. The median age was 40 years. For every 100 females there were 121.6 males. For every 100 females age 18 and over, there were 115.1 males.

The median income for a household in the city was $16,979, and the median income for a family was $17,292. Males had a median income of $25,625 versus $11,250 for females. The per capita income for the city was $8,927. About 33.3% of families and 37.3% of the population were below the poverty line, including 65.7% of those under the age of eighteen and none of those 65 or over.

Climate
The Köppen Climate System classifies the weather as humid continental, abbreviated as Dfb.

Judith Gap Wind Farm

Because of its topography and prevailing winds, Judith Gap is the site of one of the most ambitious wind power projects in the United States. The 90 wind turbines at the Judith Gap Wind Farm have a nameplate capacity of 135 MW.

Judith Gap Wind Farm

Education
Judith Gap School educates students from kindergarten through 12th grade. Judith Gap High School's team name is the Tigers.

Judith Gap is part of the Tri-City sports coop with Hobson and Moore.

See also

 List of municipalities in Montana

References

External links

Cities in Wheatland County, Montana
Cities in Montana